Sompura Salat are a Hindu Vishwakarma Brahmin community of Gujarat, which have branched off from Sompura Brahmin community. They are also found in southern Rajasthan, specially in the Mewar region. Their origin is said to be from Prabhas Patan famous for the Somnath temple. The term "salat" is derived from Shilavat, the old term for a temple architect.

Culture
They are group of people, who took artistic and masonry works as an occupation. Few Brahmins from other parts of the country do accept them as brahmins but some donot, due to some disagreements. The community use surnames like; Trivedi, Dave, Raval, Vyas, Acharya, Shukla, Bhatt etc. However, Sompura Brahmin do not accept them as Brahmins. They maintain clan exogamy as a strict rule for marriage. 

The community is vegetarian in diet and also avoid eating onions, garlic, white cucumber and lentils. They worship Ashapura Mata as their clan deity. They are basically a Shivaite community and worship Shiva as chief deity, however, also observe all other Hindu festivals like Uthasini, Ramanavami, Janamashtmi, Holi, Diwali but Shivaratri and Navaratri are the main festival for the community.

Occupation
They are specialized in masonry works, artistic carvings and sculpting as well as artistic stone shaping works, especially in works of idol-making. Among the notable architecture built by them are Hawa Mahal, the royal palace near Wadhwan built for the Sultanate of Gujarat and more recently the Somnath Temple built after independence of India.

Demography
The community is found thorough out Gujarat but largely concentrated in Saurashtra region.
Outside India, population is found in United Kingdom and United States of America.

Restoration and building of temples

Prabhashankar Oghadbhai of Palitana, had been one of the leading designers of Nagar style of temples. He was awarded Padmashri. The design and building of the modern Somnath Temple, known as Somnath Maha Meru Prasad, was executed by him. 

While their center of activity is in Gujarat and Rajasthan, they now undertake temple architecture in different parts of India, as well as overseas. They follow texts written in the 15th century such as Prasad Manjari, written during the rule of Rana Raimal by brothers Mandan and Nathji. They originally hailed from Patan, Gujarat  and were invited to settle in Chittorgarh. During the past five centuries, they have been involved in building and restoration of numerous Jain temples in Gujarat and southern Rajasthan, as well as temples built by Jains from there regions in other parts of India.

In 1992, Chandrakant Sompura, grandson of Prabhashankar had designed the Sompura Akshardham temple in Gandhinagar. He was asked by Ashok Singhal, chief of the Vishwa Hindu Parishad, to design and build the Ram Janmabhoomi temple.

The world's largest Ram Temple, a proposed replica of Angkor Wat to be built in Champaran, Bihar, is being designed by Piyush Sompura

C.P. Trivedi and Sons, founded by Chandulal P. Trivedi  from the Sompura clan, were responsible for the restoration of the Delwara Jain temples and the Jain temples at Jaisalmer Fort and the Amar Sagar Lake. They also designed the Kirti Stumbh at Hutheesing Wadi in Ahmedabad,  Oswal Jain Temple at Nairobi, Kenya, Jain Center, Leicester, UK, Atma Vallabh Smarak, Delhi, and the Global Vipassana Pagoda at Gorai in northwest Mumbai.

Virendra Trivedi, nephew of Chandulal Trivedi, also participated on the Global Vipassana Pagoda project, but is best known for being the Chief Architect responsible for the Akshardham temple in New Delhi.

References

Social groups of Gujarat
Brahmin communities of Gujarat